The black seasnail (Paraliparis bathybius) is a species of fish in the family Liparidae (snailfish).

Description

The black seasnail has a long and tapering body (maximum ), black and grey in colour, with large head, dorsal and anal fins that run the length of the body, and a much reduced caudal fin, although it has no adhesive disc, unlike other snailfish. The pectoral fins have two lobes, the lower having 3–4 rays.

Habitat

Behaviour
It feeds on amphipods, gastropods and mysids.

References

Liparidae
Fish described in 1879
Taxa named by Robert Collett